Cutter Garcia is an American actor. He is the voice of Torn in the Jak and Daxter video game series.

Career
Garcia has made appearances in television series such as Monk, Weeds, Pretty Little Liars, Agents of S.H.I.E.L.D., and Mom. He voiced Torn in the Jak and Daxter video game series and has done voice work in the video games Ratchet & Clank Future: A Crack in Time, L.A. Noire and Benno's Great Race Interactive Ride. He was also the co-host of NIGHTSHIFT from 1992 to 1993 and the writer and producer of Yummie Creative from 2000 to 2013.

Education
Garcia attended the University of Massachusetts Amherst from 1989 to 1994 and received his bachelor's degree in journalism.

Filmography

Film

Television

Video games

Other

References

External links
 
 

Living people
American male film actors
American male television actors
American male video game actors
American male voice actors
American male writers
Male actors from Massachusetts
University of Massachusetts Amherst College of Social and Behavioral Sciences alumni
Writers from Massachusetts
21st-century American male actors
21st-century American writers
Year of birth missing (living people)